The ABC Cricket Book is a softcover book published annually by the Australian Broadcasting Corporation which covers international and local cricket and focusses particularly on the Australian cricket team.

It was first published in 1934 and is now Australia's longest running cricket journal.  The current editor is ABC cricket commentator Jim Maxwell.

Further reading
Maxwell, Jim. Ashes from Bodyline to Waugh: 70 Years of the ABC Cricket Book (2002) 
Maxwell, Jim. The ABC Cricket Book: The First 60 Years (1994) 

Cricket books
Australian Broadcasting Corporation